Antonia Gordiana (born 201) was a prominent, wealthy and noble Roman woman who lived in the troubled and unstable 3rd century. She was the daughter of Roman Emperor Gordian I; sister to Roman Emperor Gordian II and mother to Roman Emperor Gordian III. 
The Augustan History names her as  Maecia Faustina, however modern historians dismiss this name as false. She was most probably born in Rome. Along with her elder brother they were raised and spent their childhoods in the house that Roman Republican General Pompey had built in Rome. Previous owners included Roman Triumvir Mark Antony and Roman Emperor Tiberius. 

After 214, Gordiana married an unnamed Roman Senator. The Augustan History names her husband as Junius Balbus, however modern historians dismiss this name as being incorrect. She bore her husband a son, Marcus Antonius Gordianus Pius (known as Gordian III), who was born on 20 January 225. The birth name of Gordian III is unknown as is his birthplace. The name of Gordian (as we know him) was assumed by Gordiana's son when he became Roman Emperor. Gordiana's husband died before 238.

After the brief reigns of her father and brother, the Roman Senate in April appointed Balbinus and Pupienus as joint emperors. During the brief reign of Balbinus and Pupienus, her son became popular with Roman citizens and the joint emperors were forced to adopt her son as their heir. On 29 July 238, Balbinus and Pupienus were both murdered by the Praetorian Guard and later that day her son became the new Roman Emperor. There is a possibility that Gordiana might have bribed the Guards to murder the joint emperors, so that her son could become emperor. 

To keep in the favour of the Roman Senate, Gordian III assumed the name of his maternal grandfather and maternal uncle. The political factions that supported Gordiana's father and brother, also supported her son. Through them, she was able to assist her son in directing affairs and together they sought to reform policies covering administration, fiscal affairs, and the Roman army. Efforts were made to limit the taxes on the Roman wealthy and notable. Attention was directed to strengthening defences along the empire's borders and Roman governors were prosecuted if they abused Roman taxes and their powers in governing the provinces. 

In 241, her son appointed the able and efficient Timesitheus as prefect of the Praetorian Guard. Later, in May of that year, Gordian married Timesitheus’ daughter Tranquillina, who became Roman Empress. Timesitheus died in 243, and Gordian appointed the ambitious Philip the Arab as the new prefect. In February 244, Gordian died of unknown causes. Gordian either died in battle or was possibly murdered on the orders of Philip.  Philip was then proclaimed the new emperor. Gordian III's wife and daughter survived him. The fate of Gordiana after her son's death is unknown.

Family tree

Sources
 http://www.roman-emperors.org/gordo1.htm
 http://www.roman-emperors.org/gordo3.htm
 http://www.fofweb.com/Onfiles/Ancient/AncientDetail.asp?iPin=AGRW0295
 http://gordianiiirpc.ancients.info/reign%20of%20gordian.html

3rd-century Roman women
201 births
Date of death unknown
Antonii
Gordian dynasty
Daughters of Roman emperors